Jackie Taylor (born August 10, 1951) is an American actress, director and theater producer.  She is the founder and CEO of the Black Ensemble Theater in Chicago.

Taylor grew up in the Cabrini–Green housing projects in Chicago.  She has acted in several films beginning with Cooley High (1975), as well as on television and stage.  Among other honors, Taylor has been given the lifetime achievement award by the League of Chicago Theaters,  and Actors' Equity's Rosetta LeNoire Award for "outstanding artistic contributions to the universality of the human experience in American Theater".

References

External links

American theatre managers and producers
American stage actresses
American film actresses
American television actresses
1951 births
Living people
21st-century American actresses